WRBH (88.3 MHz) is a non-commercial FM radio station in New Orleans, Louisiana.  It primarily provides a radio reading service for the blind and print-handicapped without the usual use of a private subcarrier decoder, one of only three such stations in the United States.  Services include readings of books, original programming, and readings of periodicals, including The Wall Street Journal and The Times-Picayune/The New Orleans Advocate. WYPL in Memphis, Tennessee, provides similar services. The station also carries Tulane Green Wave sports, including Tulane's women's basketball and baseball.

The station's licensee is Radio For The Blind & Print Handicapped. The station has an effective radiated power (ERP) of 51,000 watts. The transmitter is located on Tournefort Street in Chalmette, Louisiana.

Founding 

WRBH was founded by a local mathematician, Dr. Robert McClean, who was blind. He envisioned an FM reading radio station, with programming content for the blind and visually impaired. In 1975, McClean began leasing airtime from WWNO and renting studio space from New Orleans’ Lighthouse for the Blind. By 1982, his efforts expanded after purchasing the 88.3 FM wavelength, officially making WRBH the United States’ first 24-hour FM reading radio station for the blind.

In 1994, WRBH purchased a 4,000-square-foot, 19th-century Victorian building on New Orleans’ Magazine Street. This location serves as WRBH's recording studio and administrative space. In 2000, WRBH added its programming to the internet via live audio streaming and podcasts.

In 2014, WRBH partnered with HEROfarm, a New Orleans-based marketing and public relations firm, to redesign its logo and website while also making the site fully compatible with screen reading software. The station is used by visually-impaired persons in the New Orleans region and others worldwide through its online streaming capabilities.

Background 

The majority of information in print and on the internet is not easily accessible to those who cannot read. For the blind and print handicapped community, this lack of access to information can increase their sense of isolation, lower their standard of living, and become a serious obstacle in everyday life. WRBH seeks to keep everyone equally informed by providing access to news and information, promoting cultural enrichment, and encouraging mental and emotional independence for those who cannot read.

WRBH offers a wide variety of programming including local and national news, best-selling fiction and non-fiction books, magazine articles, children's books, event calendars, interview segments, health programs, cooking shows, and grocery store ads, as well as shows geared toward Spanish, Haitian, and Vietnamese communities. This programming is available 24 hours a day, 365 days a year because of the work of over 150 volunteers who donate nearly 5,000 hours of their time annually.

WRBH produces several in-house shows including Charlie's Music Show where host Charles Smith interviews musicians of all genres, Writers Forum, which provides an opportunity for local authors to discuss their work, and New Orleans by Mouth, moderated by Amy Sins.

Audience 

WRBH's target audience is those with difficulty in reading. While the majority of reading services for the blind use mechanized voice software, WRBH is the only organization providing this variety of programming via the human voice from over 150 volunteers. This makes WRBH's programs particularly of interest to the newly blind or those who have experienced vision loss due to age, since it can take several years for the untrained ear to become accustomed to the speed and cadence of the mechanized voice software.

In addition, WRBH's content is also of interest to the general public, who tune in to listen to the news, event listings, best-selling fiction and nonfiction books, short stories, magazine articles, and an array of programs encouraging cultural, educational, and emotional enrichment.

Since 2000, WRBH has served a world-wide audience by making audio streaming and podcasts available free of charge over the internet. WRBH's terrestrial broadcasting power is 25,000 watts, making the station's FM signal available across a 90-mile radius stretching over Hancock County, Mississippi and the following Louisiana parishes: Orleans, Jefferson, St. Tammany, St. Charles, St. John, Terrebonne, St. Bernard, and Plaquemines.

WRBH and the New Orleans Community 

WRBH's goal for the New Orleans community and beyond is to engage, energize, and empower its listeners through access to information and entertainment. WRBH has received several awards including a Proclamation of Recognition for 30 Years of Service from the City of New Orleans in 2012, the 1999 Governor's Media Award, the 1998 Mayor's Medal of Honor, and in 1990 was named the 257th Point of Light by President George Bush, Sr.

To further its outreach in the community, the station collaborates with the following organizations that share common goals or serve the blind and print handicapped in other ways:

 Lighthouse for the Blind serves the blind and visually impaired community by providing quality products, services, and opportunities for independence. WRBH guest lectures at their classes twice a year, refers listeners to their services, and supports their organization through public service announcements (PSAs). 
 Blinded Veterans Association promotes the welfare of blinded veterans so that they may take their rightful place in the community and work with their fellow citizens toward the creation of a peaceful world. WRBH participates in their annual expo and supports them through PSAs.
 New Orleans Filipino-American Lions Club refurbishes used eyeglasses for the needy. WRBH acts as a drop off spot for used glasses, supports them through PSAs, and allows their directors to meet in WRBH's board room once a month, free of charge.
 Entergy:  Since 2009, WRBH has partnered with Entergy to broadcast Going Green, which educates listeners on energy efficiency. Entergy underwrites the program, while Entergy and WRBH generate the educational content.
 Ben Franklin High School: WRBH partners with Ben Franklin High School during “Hogs for the Cause,” a fundraising festival for families with children being treated for brain cancer. Ben Franklin High School's Student Council Members volunteer to help WRBH in this event. 
 Young Leadership Council: WRBH partners with the Young Leadership Council (YLC) to broadcast “One Book One New Orleans.” YLC spearheads the campaign for literacy, which calls on residents to share the experience of reading the same book each fall. WRBH records and broadcasts an audio recording of the book, read by YLC youth volunteers.
 The Big Read, a project of the National Endowment for the Arts, supports community-wide reading programs that encourage reading and participation by diverse audiences. Southern Food and Beverage Museum acts as host, and WRBH records the book and advertises the program.

External links
WRBH's website

References

Radio stations in New Orleans
Radio reading services of the United States
Radio stations established in 1982
1982 establishments in Louisiana